Evelyn James Metcalfe (29 September 1865 – 14 June 1951) was an English first-class cricketer.

Metcalfe was born at Kennington in September 1865. He was educated at Eton College. Shortly after leaving Eton he emigrated to Australia, where he would spend the next 25 years. He played first-class cricket while living in Australia for Queensland against New South Wales in 1895, and South Australia in 1899. He scored 53 runs and took a single wicket in this two first-class matches. He was referred to by Wisden as one of the best slip fieldsmen in Australia. He visited England during the summer of 1903, playing minor counties cricket for Hertfordshire and making seven appearances in the Minor Counties Championship. Upon his return to England he took teams on tours to Philadelphia and Canada. In addition to playing cricket, Metcalfe also played lawn tennis for Queensland. He died at Cambridge in June 1951.

References

External links

1865 births
1951 deaths
People from Kennington
People educated at Eton College
English emigrants to Australia
English male tennis players
English cricketers
Queensland cricketers
Hertfordshire cricketers